The Office of Mercy is a 2013 dystopian science fiction novel written by Ariel Djanikian.

Plot summary
A post-apocalyptic America is left peopled by those who inhabit emotionally controlled high-tech underground settlements such as America-Five, and wild, emotionally fierce people of the Tribes. Natasha Wiley works in America-Five's Department of Mercy, where she tracks tribespeople above ground for extermination or "mercy".

References

External links
Author's official site

2013 American novels
2013 science fiction novels
American science fiction novels
Post-apocalyptic novels
Dystopian novels
2013 debut novels
Penguin Books books